IRNSS-1F is the sixth navigation satellite out of seven in the Indian Regional Navigational Satellite System (IRNSS) series of satellites after IRNSS-1A, IRNSS-1B, IRNSS-1C, IRNSS-1D and IRNSS-1E. The satellite is one among the seven of the IRNSS constellation of satellites launched to provide navigational services to the region.

Launch 
It was launched aboard a PSLV-XL rocket bearing flight number C32 and was successfully put into geosynchronous orbit at 1601 hrs IST on 10 March 2016.

Spacecraft 
The satellite carries two types of payloads. The navigation payload transmit navigation service signals to users and ranging payload consists of C-band transponder that facilitates accurate determination of the range of the satellite.

It carries Corner Cube Retro Reflectors for laser ranging.

IRNSS-1F has a 12-year mission life.

See also

 Communication-Centric Intelligence Satellite (CCI-Sat)
 GPS-aided geo-augmented navigation (GAGAN)
 Satellite navigation

References

External links 
 ISRO Future Programmes
 IRNSS 1F Real time tracking

Spacecraft launched by India in 2016
IRNSS satellites
Spacecraft launched by PSLV rockets